Riff Raff is a 1984 album by Welsh rock musician Dave Edmunds. The album was his third release for Arista Records (in the UK) and Columbia Records (in the US), following 1983's Information.

Riff Raff continued Edmunds' collaboration with Electric Light Orchestra frontman Jeff Lynne; Lynne produced six tracks on the albums, and wrote three of the songs. However, compared to the pair's success with Information (which hit #51 on the Billboard 200 album chart and spawned a top-40 single in "Slipping Away"), Riff Raff was a commercial flop. The album made it to only #140. "Something About You" failed to crack the Billboard Hot 100 (although it did hit #16 on the Mainstream Rock Tracks chart).

Riff Raff was the last time Edmunds and Lynne would collaborate on record.  Edmunds wouldn't make another studio album for six years (although he would release a live album in the interim).

The majority of the tracks on Riff Raff are originals by Lynne, Edmunds, and band member John David. The most notable cover is the aforementioned "Something About You", originally a top-20 hit for the Four Tops in 1965.

Track listing
 "Something About You" (Lamont Dozier, Eddie Holland, Brian Holland) – 3:03
 "Breaking Out" (Jeff Lynne) – 3:26
 "Busted Loose" (Paul Brady) – 4:33
 "Far Away" (Jeff Lynne) – 4:11
 "Rules of the Game" (John David) – 4:10
 "Steel Claw" (Paul Brady) – 4:18
 "S.O.S." (Jeff Lynne) – 3:14
 "Hang On" (Steve Gould) – 3:24
 "How Could I Be So Wrong" (John David) – 3:20
 "Can't Get Enough" (Dave Edmunds) – 3:08

Personnel
Dave Edmunds - guitar, vocals
John David - bass
Paul Jones - harmonica
Richard Tandy - keyboards
Terry Williams - drums
Gered Mankowitz - photography

Charts

References

Dave Edmunds albums
Arista Records albums
Columbia Records albums
1984 albums
Albums produced by Jeff Lynne
Albums produced by Dave Edmunds